Dezső Király (5 February 1896 – 11 June 1966) was a Hungarian writer. His work was part of the literature event in the art competition at the 1928 Summer Olympics.

References

1896 births
1966 deaths
20th-century Hungarian male writers
Olympic competitors in art competitions
Writers from Budapest